CFIQ (640 kHz) is a commercial AM radio station licensed to Richmond Hill, Ontario, and serving Greater Toronto. The station airs a talk format and is known as 640 Toronto. It is owned by Corus Entertainment with radio studios and offices in the Corus Quay Building at 25 Dockside Drive in Toronto.

CFIQ is powered at 50,000 watts, the maximum for Canadian AM stations. To protect other stations on 640 AM, it must use a directional antenna. Although it is licensed to a suburban community north of the city, its transmitter is about 60 kilometers (38 miles) south of Toronto. CFIQ's eight-tower array is in the town of Lincoln, in Niagara Region, near the southeast corner of Greenlane and Merritt Road. This location allows the station's signal to cover a large part of Southern Ontario beyond Greater Toronto, as well as Western New York state during the day and at night.

History

Early years
On July 1, 1957, the station first signed on as CJRH. It was a 500-watt station, broadcasting on 1300 kHz. The last two letters in the call sign referred to its city of license, Richmond Hill. It moved to 1310 in 1959, and changed its call letters to CFGM in 1961. The station adopted a country format in 1964. A few years later, it became Canada's first 24-hour country station. Don Daynard, a longtime personality on CHFI-FM, was a host on CFGM in the 1960s.

The station moved to 1320 in 1978, and to 640 kHz on September 16, 1988.

Top 40 era

After 26 years as a country station, CFGM changed its format and call letters at 5 p.m. on June 29, 1990, broadcasting a rock-leaning Top 40/CHR format as AM 640 The Hog, CHOG (which would later shift towards a more mainstream direction in September 1991). In June 1992, the station rebranded as AM 640 The Beat Of Toronto, and adjusted its format to Rhythmic CHR.

Several notable radio personalities were associated with the station during this era, including John Gallagher, Tarzan Dan (Freeman), Pat Cochrane, Adrian Bell, Tony Monaco, Deanna Nason, Randy Taylor, Eric Hollo, Kenny 'The Hitman' Caughlin, Roger Kelly and the Toronto radio team of Jesse and Gene. After CFTR moved from contemporary hits to all-news in 1993, AM 640 (still with the calls CHOG) was the last Top 40 station in the Toronto radio market until CISS-FM adopted the format in February 1999. Talk shows would later come to take up a substantial part of the station's schedule, particularly during midday periods when many of the station's hit music listeners might normally be in school.

Shift to Talk

On October 10, 1995, at 10 p.m., the station changed to a full-time talk format. As Talk 640, the station aired syndicated shows such as Joy Browne, Rhona Raskin, Dr. Laura and Live Audio Wrestling, along with local programming hosted by personalities such as Gene Valaitis, Jane Hawtin, Bill Carroll, Shelley Klinck, Marsha Lederman, Karen Horsman, Michael Coren, Dave Chalk, Spaceman Gary Bell and Roger Kelly.

Despite regular adjustments, including acquiring the radio broadcast rights to the Toronto Maple Leafs, the station received low ratings. During this period, the station adopted the call letters CFYI. The weekend programming was a hit with "The Touch of Health" a show that started with just a half hour in 1997 to a two-hour nationally syndicated show airing 2 to 4 p.m. Saturdays. Hosted, produced and managed by Christine McPhee, other weekend shows were the "Pet Show" with Mitch Levitsky, a "Cruise Show", a "Law Show", a "Beauty Show", and the "Small Canada Business Show".

Mojo Radio 

In 2000, the station was acquired by Corus Entertainment.  On April 23, 2001, at 6:40 a.m., the station re-launched as Mojo Radio, a hot talk radio format aimed at the male demographic. The station also changed its call letters the same day to CFMJ.

The new format featured programs hosted by Humble and Fred, John Derringer, Phil Hendrie, Mike Stafford, Andrew Krystal, Spider Jones, and the syndicated Coast to Coast AM. Later on, John Oakley replaced Scruff Connors who had taken over from Humble and Fred; the latter pair left for hot adult contemporary station CKFM-FM in July 2003. Krystal moved to part-time work at CFRB and CKTB before moving to CJNI-FM in Halifax. Derringer's Mojo show was later discontinued as he concentrated on his marquee morning show on co-owned CILQ-FM.

AM640 Toronto Radio 
In 2004, due to low ratings (MOJO was typically hovering around a 1.4 share), the station moved away from the male-oriented imaging to a more general news and talk format as AM640 Toronto Radio. Oakley and Stafford continued to host the major morning and afternoon drive programs. Craig Bromell joined the station as co-host of a new late morning program, The Beat (later rebranded as Bromell! in 2006), and in 2005, Charles Adler's nationally syndicated radio show was added to mid-afternoons. Award-winning journalist Arlene Bynon was added to the ranks in 2006 to host the Saturday afternoon Toronto Weekend program, which expanded to include a Sunday edition as well.

Near the end of July 2007, the programming line-up was shuffled in response to the departure of Craig Bromell, whose show ran until the end of August 2007. Afternoon host Mike Stafford replaced Bromell. The Bill Watters Show was added to the afternoon lineup. Just as the new show with co-host Jeff Marek expanded, Marek moved on to Sirius Satellite Radio. Greg Brady replaced Marek as Bill's co-host. Brady left AM640 in late June 2010 to host a Noon - 3pm program on The FAN 590. Bill Hayes, formerly of Q107, replaced Greg Brady as Watters' co-host. Hayes was fired in January 2011. Co-hosting duties then fell to his son, Brian Hayes. Hayes left AM640 on Friday, April 8 to host his own mid-morning program on TSN Radio 1050. AM640's Leafs play-by-play colour analyst Jim Ralph became co-host of The Bill Watters Show, which ran from 4pm – 7pm covering hockey issues and other major sports news as well, up until July 15, 2011.

Veteran host and reporter John Downs was let go in early August, 2010. His 7pm - 9pm slot was then hosted by Bryan Hayes, whose program was primarily sports-talk, until April 12, 2011 when Bryan took the mid-day host slot at TSN Radio 1050. Charles Adler's 2pm - 4pm program was moved to the 7pm - 9pm slot at the end of August 2012.

Charles Adler hosted a Toronto-based hour from 1pm - 2pm during the summer of 2010. On August 30, 2010, Arlene Bynon took over hosting duties for the 1pm - 2pm hour, with news anchor Tina Trigiani guest-hosting Friday afternoons. On July 18, 2011, The Bill Watters Show was canceled and Arlene Bynon took over the 4-7pm time slot. Tina Trigiani was the host of the 1-2p slot Monday to Friday. On July 2, 2014, Trijiani's hour was taken over by host Jeff McArthur.

Jeff McArthur, former morning show host for both CFPL-FM and AM in London, Ontario, joined AM640 in late August 2012 to host weekdays 2pm - 4pm. On July 2, 2014, his show was expanded to add the 1-2pm time slot.

On January 7, 2013, Arlene Bynon's afternoon program was replaced by Bill Carroll. Arlene stayed on as cohost for the following three weeks. Her last day was January 29. She now hosts a show on "Canada Talks" Channel 167 on Sirius XM Radio. Bill Carroll hosted the 4-7pm weekday slot in Toronto in addition to his a separate show on Los Angeles talk radio station KFI (which is also at 640 on the AM dial)

One of the station's biggest draws was that it was the radio broadcaster of the Toronto Maple Leafs, which it networked into other markets. Its play-by-play announcers were Joe Bowen, Dennis Beyak, Jim Ralph and Dan Dunleavy. Dennis Beyak left in the fall of 2011 to do the play-by-play for the Winnipeg Jets on TSN regional television and on TSN Radio 1290 CFRW. AM640's 7-year contract for the rights to Toronto Maple Leafs radio broadcasts concluded before the start of the 2012-13 NHL seasonLeafs broadcasts are now split between CHUM and CJCL.

CFMJ's studios were in Suite 1600 at 1 Dundas Street West in Toronto, until Corus moved all of its Toronto-based radio, television and other assets into Corus Quay upon its completion in the summer of 2010. On September 8, 2015, CFMJ began simulcasting on co-owned CING-FM's HD-2 sub-channel.

Global News Radio 640 Toronto
CFMJ, along with several other Corus's news/talk radio stations across Canada were relaunched under the new national Global News Radio brand between November and December 2017.  The new moniker matches the Global News brand which is already used for the newscasts on Global Television's owned-and-operated stations, including CFMJ's sister station, CIII-DT, which was acquired by Corus Entertainment as part of its acquisition of the Shaw Communications media unit.  The official changeover to Global News Radio 640 Toronto occurred on December 1, 2017, with CFMJ maintaining its talk format and on-air roster.

640 Toronto
The "Global News Radio" branding was dropped in January 2022 to avoid confusion between news and talk programming on the station. The station continues to have a shared newsroom with Global News and the newscasts themselves are still identified as Global News. This comes one month after Amanda Cupido was hired as the station's Program Director.

On May 1, 2022, the station's call sign was changed to CFIQ. The current weekday talk show lineup includes Greg Brady hosting Toronto Today in the morning drive slot followed by Kelly Cutrara, Alan Carter, Jeff McArthur, John Oakley, Alex Pierson and Ben O'Hara-Byrne, with Shane Hewitt in the overnight slot.

Effective August 8, 2022, Carter and McArthur discontinued their shows in order to focus on their duties at Global Television. Cutrata moved to early afternoons and Pierson moved from evenings to the 9 am to noon slot, following Greg Brady.

Defunct programs

Toronto Maple Leafs hockey
From the 1998 until 2012, the station aired radio broadcasts of Toronto Maple Leafs hockey broadcasts. Dennis Beyak was the team's play-by-play commentator when Joe Bowen called games on television, though Bowen continued to call games on radio when the Leafs aired on national TV. Beyak was replaced by Dan Dunleavy in 2011 when he left for TSN to be the Winnipeg Jets play by play commentator.

The station no longer airs the Leafs broadcasts since the 2012–13 season. All games have since been split with CJCL and CHUM, owned by Rogers and Bell, respectively. Both media companies co-own the parent company of the team.

The Morning Show
On November 7, 2016, the station launched a new morning drive show, The Morning Show, pairing National Post columnist and editor Matt Gurney with CBC contributor and lawyer Supriya Dwivedi as co-hosts, replacing the John Oakley Show, which moved to afternoon drive. In February 2018, as part of the station's "revitalization" following its rebranding as Global News Radio, Gurney was moved to the 9 am to noon slot to host The Exchange with Matt Gurney, and Mike Stafford was moved to The Morning Show with Dwivedi remaining as co-host.

On November 27, 2020, Dwivedi announced on-air that she was leaving the show and Global, filing a complaint with the Canadian Human Rights Commission alleging that the station had allowed its on-air talent and callers to spread "false narratives" about refugees, Muslims and other groups on air, unchallenged, and refused to enforce journalistic standards on talk radio resulting in her "receiving an increase in racist comments and violent threats". In her resignation letter, she stated “I can no longer be part of an ecosystem that tolerates and in some cases, actively sows division and discord... As a female, racialized journalist, I have been subject to rape threats against me and my 17-month old daughter and absolutely abhorrent statements from members of the public when I attempt to counter and correct the misinformation and false narratives promoted by other hosts and guests on the station.”

Mike Stafford remained as the show's host, with rotating guest co-hosts, until June 2021 when he was fired, after 20 years at the station, for using a racial slur in an internal company group chat while commenting that Ontario Premier Doug Ford was likely to slip up and use the slur during his press conference. Stafford had previously been briefly suspended in 2019 after making derogatory comments about South Asians and Muslims on social media.

Leafs Lunch
Jeff Marek was offered a position with Sirius Satellite Radio and CBC's Hockey Night in Canada to host a new show. On September 7, 2007 Marek announced that he was leaving Leafs Lunch on AM 640 Toronto Radio to pursue a new route in radio broadcasting on the Hockey Night in Canada radio show on Sirius Satellite Radio Channel 122. Brian Duff from the NHL Network was the program's host for a period of time until he was replaced by TSN Hockey Insider Darren Dreger. On July 5, 2010, Leafs Lunch was canceled. Leafs Lunch returned to Talk Radio AM640's Saturday and Sunday lineups, filling the noon - 1pm timeslot until spring of 2011, when it was cancelled.

Tina Trigiani
Trigiani's show aired weekdays between 1pm and 2pm, this show generally covered lighter news and popular interest topics. Like the Stafford Show, a main topic was introduced and then Tina took input from listeners via e-mail and phone calls. Adding occasional colour to the show was added by Trigiani's call screener, Ryan Bonnar and technical producer Patrick Malkin. AM640 Host Jeff McArthur's show absorbed the hour in the summer of 2014.

Bill Carroll
Aired weekdays from 4pm - 7pm. Bill Carroll hosted the afternoon drive slot along with commentary from news anchor Sandy Salerno and producer Chris Chreston until early 2016. The opening segment of each show was known as "Carroll on the News" in which Salerno, Chreston and Carroll discussed the day's major news stories. This portion of the show was taped earlier in the day due to a conflict with Carroll's show on KFI 640 in Los Angeles. Carroll resigned from his position in Los Angeles, but soon after left AM640 in early 2016 for 580 CFRA in Ottawa.

The Post Game Show with Andy Frost
Following each Toronto Maple Leafs game, radio host and Leafs PA announcer, Andy Frost discussed the ups and downs of the night's game. Much of the broadcast involves taking phone calls from the show's audience. This show was cancelled on the station, however Frost remained an evening and weekend host on AM640's sister station Q107.

A View from Space
For over 15 years, Gary Bell (nicknamed 'The Spaceman') hosted a show, broadcast on Saturday nights, that dealt with current events, numerology and conspiracy theories . The show was cancelled, following its November 11, 2017 broadcast, when parent company Corus fired the late-night host citing complaints of anti-Semitic content.  Bell also worked as a producer for various weekday shows during his time at the station and had previously worked as a technician at CKGM and CFTR. He died of cancer in June 2018.

Tasha Kheiriddin
Weekdays from 12:00pm–2:00pm Tasha Kheiriddin focused on politics and lifestyle. The show was produced by Jackie Lamport. The show featured a Political Panel every Wednesday from 1:20 - 1:40pm. On Fridays during the same time slot a Top 3 panel took place where three women joined the show to talk about three of the top stories of the week. Notable panelists included Maddie Di Muccio, Lisa Kinsella, Anne Lagacé Dowson, and Sophie Nadaeu. The final edition of the program aired March 1, 2019 when it ended its run after three years.

The Exchange with Matt Gurney
Aired weekdays from 9am - 12pm, The Exchange was a news based talk show with host Matt Gurney. Heather Purdon, Mike Stafford's former producer, produced the show. The show was launched in February 2018 and ended in February 2019.

Notable on-air staff and alumni
Dennis Beyak, play-by-play commentator for Leafs broadcasts
Bill Carroll
Andy Frost
Jeff Marek

See also
 CKGO, a radio station in Vancouver that also used the Mojo format
 CKNW, a talk radio station in Vancouver, British Columbia that is also under Corus Entertainment
 CHML, a talk radio station in Hamilton, Ontario that is also under Corus Entertainment
 CJOB, a talk radio station in Winnipeg that is also under Corus Entertainment

References

External links
 640 Toronto
 History of Canadian Broadcasting
 
 

FIQ
FIQ
FIQ
Richmond Hill, Ontario
FIQ
Toronto Maple Leafs
1957 establishments in Ontario
Radio stations established in 1957